IHOP may refer to:

 International House of Pancakes, known as IHOP
 Dine Brands Global, formerly known as "IHOP Corporation" and "dineEquity"
 International House of Prayer, an evangelical charismatic Pentecostal Christian missions organization in Kansas City, Missouri
 Information Hyperlinked over Proteins, or iHOP, is a web portal on gene and protein interactions mostly derived from abstracts of scientific publications

See also
House of Prayer (denomination), Christian group in the conservative holiness movement